Korangi J-area, Korangi, Sindh - South is located in Pakistan. Its zip code is 75900.

Address and Postcode

Title :
Korangi J-area, Korangi, Sindh - South
City :
Korangi J-area
Region 2 :
Korangi
Region 1 :
Sindh - South
Country :
Pakistan (PK)
Postcode (ZIP) :
75900

Other Information

Language :
English (EN)
Region Code (ISO2) :
None
Time Zone (TZ) :
Asia/Karachi
Coordinated Universal Time (UTC) :
UTC+5
Daylight Saving Time (DST) :
Yes (Y)
‹ previous :
75190
next › :
75160

See also 

 Korangi
 Korangi Town
 Korangi District
 Korangi J Area
 Korangi Industrial Area
 Korangi Creek Cantonment
 Korangi (disambiguation)
 Korangi railway station

Landhi Town
Neighbourhoods of Karachi